The Matapalo broad-nosed bat (Platyrrhinus matapalensis) is a species of leaf-nosed bat described in 2005. It is found in South America.

Taxonomy and etymology
Before it was described, there were only 10 species recognized in the genus Platyrrhinus. With the description of P. matapalensis and other species since 2005, the total is now at least 20 species. P. matapalensis was described as the result of a taxonomic split in Heller's broad-nosed bat, with the "Eastern" populations retaining the name P. helleri, and the "Western" populations described as P. matapalensis. The holotype for the species was collected in July 1954 in Zarumilla, Peru by Peruvian ornithologist Celestino Kalinowski. Its species name matapalensis is derived from the Matapalo District, where the holotype was found.

Description
The fur on its back is light brown, with individual hairs tricolored. The face is striped and the fur on its belly is brownish, with individual hairs bicolored or unicolored, depending on the individual. It has a narrow dorsal stripe down the length of its spine that is the same color as its facial stripes. Its nose-leaf is longer than it is wide. The margin of the uropatagium is densely furred with a fringe of hairs.

Range and status
It is known from the western slopes of the Andes in Ecuador and Peru. It may occur in northwest Colombia, though no records support this hypothesis yet. It prefers lowland forests that are undisturbed.

It is currently evaluated as near-threatened by the IUCN. Its habitat loss has been so dramatic that the species is close to qualifying for vulnerable status.

References

External links
Images of this species and its distribution in Ecuador

Mammals described in 2005
Bats of South America
Mammals of Ecuador
Mammals of Peru
Platyrrhinus